Chang Kyung-mi (born 25 February 1982) is a former professional tennis player from South Korea.

Biography
Chang represented South Korea between 2004 and 2009, appearing in a total of 15 Fed Cup ties with a win–loss record of 7–8.

On the professional tour, she reached a best singles ranking of 254 in the world. She competed in the singles main draw of the Japan Open as a qualifier in 2002 and Korea Open as a wildcard player in 2005.

As a doubles player, Chang had a top WTA ranking of 195 and won 20 ITF titles.

ITF Circuit finals

Singles: 17 (5–12)

Doubles: 39 (20–19)

References

External links
 
 
 

1982 births
Living people
South Korean female tennis players
21st-century South Korean women